Zygobarella is a genus of flower weevils in the beetle family Curculionidae. There are at least two described species in Zygobarella.

Species
These two species belong to the genus Zygobarella:
 Zygobarella tristicula Casey & T.L., 1920
 Zygobarella xanthoxyli (Pierce, 1907)

References

Further reading

 
 
 

Baridinae
Articles created by Qbugbot